Olga Svendsen  (22 February 1883 – 22 October 1942) was a Danish stage and film actress.

Partial filmography

Storstadens Hyæne (1912) - Zoë
Gøglernes Elskov (1912) - Mutter Putois
Sladder (1913, Short)
Prins for en dag (1913) - Mayor's Wife
Professor Buchs Rejseeventyr (1913, Short)
Højt spil (1913, Short)
Kæmpedamens bortførelse (1913)
En nydelig ægtemand (1914) - Antoinette, pige hos Descombes
En skindød ægtemand (1916)
Maharajaens yndlingsflamme (1919) - Thilde Svæhr
De er splittergale (1919, Short)
Landsvägsriddare (1921, Short) - Ms. Svensson
Film, flirt og forlovelse (1921) - The Lady
Harestegen (1921) - Mrs. Nokkesen
Han, hun og Hamlet (1922) - Widow Lykke
Potteplanten (1922)
Peter Ligeglad paa Eventyr (1925) - Landlady
The Joker (1928)
Hr. Tell og søn (1930) - Tante Malle
I kantonnement (1931) - Tanten
Krudt med knald (1931) - Værtinden
Vask, videnskab og velvære (1932)
Han, hun og Hamlet (1932) - Institutsbestyrerinde
Med fuld musik (1933) - Forfatterinden
Den ny husassistent (1933) - Direktørfruen
Københavnere (1933) - Olivia
Kidnapped (1935) - Hansine
Provinsen kalder (1935)
Bag Københavns kulisser (1935) - Pensionatsværtinde
Snushanerne (1936) - Syngende Havfrue
Sjette trækning (1936) - Fru Julie 'Julle' Lund (final film role)

External links

Danish stage actresses
Danish film actresses
Danish silent film actresses
20th-century Danish actresses
Actresses from Copenhagen
1883 births
1942 deaths